Eva Štepáncíková  (born ) is a retired Czech female volleyball player, who played as a setter. She was part of the Czech Republic women's national volleyball team.

She participated in the 1994 FIVB Volleyball Women's World Championship, and at the 2002 FIVB Volleyball Women's World Championship in Germany. On club level she played with Pallavolo Palermo.

Clubs
 Pallavolo Palermo (2002)

References

1972 births
Living people
Setters (volleyball)
Czech women's volleyball players
Place of birth missing (living people)